John Tylney, 2nd Earl Tylney (1712 – 17 September 1784) was an English aristocrat and member of parliament who moved to Italy after a homosexual scandal.

Life
Child was baptized on 22 October 1712. He was the third son of Richard Child, 1st Earl Tylney, and Dorothy, daughter of John Glynne of Henley Park, Surrey. Dorothy Glynne's mother was the heiress Dorothy Tylney whose father was Frederick Tylney of Tylney Hall. Due to the inheritance, Richard Child and his sons all adopted the surname of Tylney in 1734.

John Child was educated at Westminster School in 1721 and later at Christ Church in Oxford. At the 1734 general election, his father stood down from his seat at Essex in his favour, but he was not elected. In 1750, John Child, now John Tylney became the Earl of Tylney and inherited Wanstead House, where he lived. At the 1761 general election, he was returned as Member of Parliament for Malmesbury. In February 1764, Tylney was in Florence, and later he settled in Naples.

In 1765, he was a larger seated figure included in a caricature painting by Thomas Patch. Patch was another Englishman living abroad and he had left Rome for Florence after he had been banished for a scandal based on his homosexuality. 
	 
Tylney died on 17 September 1784 in Naples. His heir was his nephew, James Tylney-Long.

Gallery

References

1712 births
1784 deaths
English LGBT politicians
English expatriates in Italy
Members of the Parliament of Great Britain for English constituencies
LGBT members of the Parliament of Great Britain
18th-century LGBT people